Byälven is a river in Varmland County, Sweden.

References

Rivers of Värmland County